Rosa Mbuamangongo (born 2 June 1969) is an Equatoguinean sprinter. She competed in the women's 200 metres at the 1988 Summer Olympics.

References

1969 births
Living people
Athletes (track and field) at the 1988 Summer Olympics
Equatoguinean female sprinters
Olympic athletes of Equatorial Guinea
Place of birth missing (living people)
Olympic female sprinters